The Odyssey is a Canadian-produced half-hour adventure-fantasy television series for children, originally broadcast from 1992 to 1994 on CBC Television.

Plot
In the series pilot, 11-year-old Jay tries to join a tree-fort club, led by the tough Keith. As per the prearranged agreement, Jay has brought something of value to contribute to the club: a telescope that belonged to his father (who has been missing several years and is presumed dead). Keith double-crosses Jay and takes the telescope, denying him admission into the club. Jay tries to retrieve the telescope with the help of his physically disabled friend Donna, who uses a crutch and a leg brace in order to walk. Jay falls from the tree-fort, striking his head against a rock and lapsing into a coma.

In the coma, Jay finds himself in a fantasy world called Downworld where no one reaches the age of 16. Not having heard of adults, the children here have shaped society in their own ways, forming mostly tribal clans in the form of Clubs, such as the Pool Club and the Library Club. The biggest and most powerful Club is the Tower, a brutal despotic police state run by the oldest kids, with Brad as the absolute ruler because he is 15, and "knows everything". Jay, not knowing how he has got here and aided by his friends Alpha and Flash (who are identical to Donna and Keith), embarks on a journey to return home — a place that he cannot remember. The journey becomes a quest to find his long-lost father, whose name happens to be Brad, who fell overboard from a small boat into a lake while they were on a fishing trip together and has not been seen since.

Meanwhile, Jay's mother and a coma therapist try to get Jay to regain consciousness, with the help of his friends.

A turning point is reached when Jay's father appears to him as he is regaining consciousness, which Jay is forced to keep as a secret from his mother. As Jay struggles to re-orient himself in the waking world and the many changes that have occurred, he finds that he is still dealing with issues through the world from his subconscious.

Cast
 Illya Woloshyn as Jay Ziegler
 Ashley Rogers as Donna/Alpha
 Tony Sampson as Keith/Flash
 Andrea Nemeth as Medea/Sierra Jones
 Mark Hildreth as Finger/Mic
 Ryan Reynolds as Macro
 Janet Hodgkinson as Val Ziegler, Jay's mother
 Dwight Koss as Dr. Max Oswald
 Jeremy Radick as Fractal/Nathan

Production
The series, created by Paul Vitols and Warren Easton, was produced in Vancouver by Water Street Pictures. Over the three years of production, 39 episodes were made.

Episodes

Season 1 (1992–93)
 The Fall
 No Fair
 Out of the Woods
 By the Book
 Checkpoint Eagle
 The Believers
 A Place Called Nowhere
 Wanted
 Galileo & the Gypsies
 In the Dark
 The Brad Exchange
 Welcome to the Tower
 The One Called Brad

Season 2 (1994)
 Lands End
 To the Lighthouse
 Some Place Like Home
 Whispers Like Thunder
 The Hall of Darkness
 The Prophecy
 The Greatest Show on Earth
 But Where is Here?
 The Big Picture
 Tick Tock
 Run for Your Life
 Who Do You Believe?
 You Decide

Season 3 (1994)
 No Way Out
 Dart to the Heart
 Learning Curve
 Night Life
 Cry Justice
 King for a Day
 The Cauldron
 Styx and Stones
 Tug of War
 Tangled Web
 No Holds Barred
 The Plague
 Time Bomb

Release

Broadcast
The pilot episode was originally aired in Canada on March 9, 1992, as The Jellybean Odyssey.

The series was shown on Network 2 in Ireland as part of their children's strand of programming The Den in 1994. The show was broadcast in the U.S. by the Sci-Fi Channel, in the UK by Nickelodeon and Channel 4 in 1995 (repeated in 1998), in France by M6 (first season only) and then by France 3 (whole series), and in a number of other countries.

The series aired in Hong Kong on ATV World.

The first 26 episodes aired in French Canada on Radio-Canada during the 1994-95 season, under the title "L'odyssée fantastique". It re-aired in 1996 and 1998.

Home media
A special edition DVD of the complete series was made in limited quantities and is sold through Omni Film Productions.

Streaming
Can also be purchased digitally from vimeo. From May 25, 2018 to Jan 9, 2019 the series was uploaded to the YouTube channel Encore+ and all 39 episodes are currently fully uploaded.

As of 2018 the series has been released online for free on Canada Media Fund’s Encore+ YouTube channel.

Accolades
Awards won by the series include Top Ten World Program at the Cologne Conference and a Canadian Gemini for Best Youth Program.

Potential reboot
In June 2016, Marblemedia and Omnifilm Entertainment announced that they had joined forces to update and reboot The Odyssey. The reboot was to be adapted by showrunners Simon Racioppa and Richard Elliott.

References

External links

Archive of the SciFi Channel's web site dedicated to the show during its run on the network
The Odyssey odyssey, the episodic story of the show's development and production, as told by its co-creator Paul Vitols

1990s Canadian children's television series
1992 Canadian television series debuts
1994 Canadian television series endings
Canadian children's fantasy television series
CBC Television original programming
Television series about children
Television shows filmed in Vancouver